Richard H. Magruder (died September 23, 1884) was a politician from Maryland. He served in the Maryland Senate from 1882 to his death in 1884.

Early life
Richard H. Magruder was born in Prince George's County, Maryland.

Career
Magruder was a Republican. In 1881, Magruder was elected to the Maryland Senate, representing Prince George's County, defeating his cousin Caleb Clarke Magruder Jr. He was re-elected in 1883. He served from 1882 to his death.

Personal life
Magruder died on September 23, 1884, at the age of 42, at his home in Bladensburg, Maryland.

References

External links
 Richard H. Magruder (Maryland State Archives)

Year of birth missing
1884 deaths
People from Prince George's County, Maryland
Republican Party Maryland state senators